Six Principle Baptist Church (also known as Stony Lane Baptist Church, Stony Lane Six Principle Baptist Church and Old Baptist Meeting House) is a historic church in North Kingstown, Rhode Island. As of 2009 it was one of the last surviving historical congregations of the Six Principle Baptist denomination and one of the oldest churches in the United States.

History
The cemetery and meeting house date to approximately 1703 when the land was deeded for use as meeting house. General Six-Principle Baptists were a denomination that developed out of the First Baptist Church in America in Providence. Rhode Island founder Roger Williams was active in both Providence and nearby North Kingstown (Wickford) during this period. The permanent congregation in North Kingstown was likely founded after 1664 when Reverend Thomas Baker, a member of the Newport congregation, removed to North Kingstown. The meeting house underwent major renovations in a Greek Revival style in 1842 although the original 18th century core of the building is believed to be present underneath the Greek Revival modifications. The church building was added to the National Register of Historic Places in 1978. As of 2009 the church still holds weekly Sunday morning services at 10:30AM, and the pastor is John Wheeler.

See also
 Baptists in the United States
 General Six-Principle Baptists
 National Register of Historic Places listings in Washington County, Rhode Island

References

External links

Stony Lane Six Principle Baptist Church website
NRHP Nomination Form

Churches completed in 1703
18th-century Baptist churches in the United States
Churches on the National Register of Historic Places in Rhode Island
Baptist churches in Rhode Island
Buildings and structures in North Kingstown, Rhode Island
Churches in Washington County, Rhode Island
Greek Revival church buildings in Rhode Island
National Register of Historic Places in Washington County, Rhode Island
1664 establishments in the Thirteen Colonies